A techno-organic virus (T-O virus) is a fictional virus appearing in American comic books published by Marvel Comics. In the comics, the T-O virus transforms organic material into techno-organic material, which resembles both machinery and living tissue. All techno-organic cells function like independent machines and carry both the virus and all information on their carriers, including memories and appearance. In the lore, this allows a damaged techno-organic being to rebuild itself from a single cell.

Marvel Universe varieties of this virus include the Transmode Virus carried by the Technarchy and Apocalypse's variant created or discovered by the fictional supervillain Apocalypse.

Transmode virus

Characteristics
The fictional Transmode virus is used by members of the Technarchy in Marvel Comics to turn other beings into techno-organic beings. The Technarchy can then feed upon the infected beings and drain their energy (visible as lights flowing through the infected creature). Once the energy has been drained, all that remains of their prey are brittle statues. If an infected creature is not drained of its energy, it becomes a Phalanx. Transmode-infected creatures are usually black and yellow, although they can change their color.

The fictional Transmode Virus is highly virulent. It can transmit via skin contact (though a Technarch can prevent transmission) and will transform a creature into a techno-organic creature within seconds. Only mutants have some resistance to the virus. For instance, Doug Ramsey was infected with the virus, but his infection only progressed very slowly and he was unaware he had been infected. This may have been caused by either his own mutant facility with computer code preventing the virus from infecting him at the usual rate, or a side-effect of the fact he was not infected in the usual manner, but had picked it up after repeatedly fusing his body and genetic code with that of the Technarch Warlock.

An infected creature also gains the ability to shapeshift. They can quickly restore themselves when damaged and can interface directly with machinery. While Technarchs feed by draining other techno-organic beings, Phalanxes have the ability to directly absorb matter (both organic and inorganic).

The Phalanx also experience a loss of individuality, forming a hive mind with other Phalanx and the need to contact other techno-organic life (a safety precaution created by the Technarchy, which considers the Phalanx to be a plague and which exterminates them whenever it discovers them).

Many mutants are soon apparently revived by a modified version of the virus in the Necrosha crossover by Selene and Eli Bard. Those mutants include Banshee,  Caliban, Pyro, Cypher and the Hellions, eventually culminating in Bard using the virus to resurrect the entire deceased mutant populace of Genosha.

Known carriers in the fiction
 Every member of the Technarchy, including Warlock and his father Magus.
 Every member of the Phalanx, including Steven Lang and Cameron Hodge.
 Many demons of Limbo including S'ym and N'Astirh. The infection was started by Magus, who was hunting his son.
 Cable, previously infected with Apocalypse's variant, has cured himself. Since Cable and Deadpool #12, Cable lives in symbiosis with an infant Phalanx. Since Avengers: X-Sanction #4, Cable is purged of this virus too and newly regenerated into human form by his daughter Hope Summers. 
 Hope, a young girl who is friends with Warlock. While the techno-organic virus did not affect her, she had no control over the virus and would infect others by touch. Hope could even infect inorganic material, something the Transmode Virus is usually incapable of doing.
 Paradigm, a mutant with technokinesis, who was infected by the Phalanx. He is a member of the third group of Hellions.
 Donald Pierce, Leper Queen, Cameron Hodge, Steven Lang, Bolivar Trask, Graydon Creed and William Stryker; infected by an offspring of Magus whose programming was rewritten by Bastion. 
 Eli Bard, an immortal vampire-like mutate who absorbed the virus from an offspring of Magus.
 Thunderbird and his entire ancestral Apache tribe, resurrected and infected by Eli Bard.
 Caliban, resurrected and infected by Eli Bard, used by Selene to detect and locate other deceased mutants to resurrect.
 Pyro, Thunderbird, Shinobi Shaw, Destiny, the original Hellions, Berzerker, Stonewall, Hemingway, Banshee, Cypher, Darkstar, Rusty Collins, Risque, Super Sabre, Tower, Hurricane, Spyne, Deadbolt, Feral, Spoor, Katu, Rem-Ram, Unus, Static, Barnacle, Fabian Cortez, Marco Delgado, Mellencamp, Siena Blaze, Skin, Synch, Bolt and Negasonic Teenage Warhead; resurrected and infected by Selene in her attempt to become a god during the storyline Necrosha.
 The entirety of the deceased mutant population of Genosha resurrected and infected by Selene in her attempt to become a god during the storyline Necrosha.
 Red Hulk was briefly infected with the virus by Cable, but was able to cure himself by superheating his body and burning it out of his system.
 X-Men Mirage, Magik, Wolfsbane, Karma and Strong Guy, who were partially infected in a 'considerate' way when Warlock spread his lifeforce over five of his friends. The infection from the first four was eliminated by transferring the virus to a dupe of Multiple Man, known as "Warlox".

Apocalypse's variant

Characteristics
It was believed that this strain of techno-organic virus was either created by Apocalypse or discovered by Apocalypse on board the Ship. This virus was actually created by Mister Sinister as a means of killing Apocalypse. This attempt failed due to Apocalypse's immense powers, and the virus fell into Apocalypse's hands. Apocalypse later used the virus to infect the infant Cable. The virus has many similarities to the Transmode Virus and the two may be closely related. Techno-organic matter of this kind usually appears as blue/grey metal.

This strain of virus is less virulent than its counterpart, needing blood contact to transmit, and usually taking a longer time to infect a person, although it can have sudden short bursts of activity, during which spikes of techno-organic matter form from the diseased body and the body's parts change their forms. Another difference with the Transmode Virus is that infection is very painful and can incapacitate a person.

Humans infected with this virus receive increased strength and the ability to directly interface with machinery. While infected material can change its shape, it is unknown whether a fully infected person is capable of shapeshifting (Apocalypse can, but he already had this power before being infected).

Known carriers in the fiction
 Apocalypse, who was infected with the techno-organic blood of a time-traveling Cable.
 Gaunt, a warlord from the future. He carried a less virulent version of the techno-organic virus, but Cable infected him with the more powerful strain, paralyzing him with pain. Gaunt was killed shortly afterwards. 
 Post, who received a blood transfusion from Cable.
 Cable, who cured himself in Cable #100, but had to mesh his original infection with that of a Phalanx embryo Cable & Deadpool #12, only to somehow revert to its resurgent form along the way. He eventually came back to prominence in Deadpool & Cable: Split Second #6.
 Metus, a childhood friend of Cable, who is accidentally infected by Cable. He was later purged of the virus and taken to be raised at the X-Mansion by Cable, with Metus revealed to not have aged since he was infected.
 Red Hulk, who was infected by Cable during the X-Sanction Saga. He managed to "burn out" the virus by generating a massive amount of radioactive heat during the early stages of infection.

Other versions
 In Exiles #20-22, a team of interdimensional heroes visited a world that had become horribly stricken with a new type of T-O virus. In this reality, Doug Ramsey had fallen ill with the Legacy Virus, and his friend Warlock was endeavoring to help him. In trying to heal Doug, Warlock infected him with the T-O virus, but the two viruses combined and formed a new and deadly disease. This version is capable of infecting mutants and the world's hero population was quickly subsumed by the new race of Vi-locks, led by Forge. Blink, the team's leader, was also infected, but the timely arrival of Odin and the Aesir saved the day. Some of the top scientists derive a serum from the blood of the Norse gods and it effectively combatted the disease.
 In the Age of Apocalypse, Apocalypse also created a techno-organic virus, one capable of assimilating both organic and technological materials, going as far as merging two separate beings into one body. This virus was used to empower Donald Pierce's Reavers, a group of T-O infected humans serving Apocalypse's regime.

See also
Nanomedicine
Bionanotechnology

References

External links
 The Techno-Organic FAQ by Soleil Lapierre

Fictional viruses
X-Men
Fictional microorganisms
Marvel Comics cyborgs
Marvel Comics weapons